Vinny Thomas is an American actor, writer, and comedian. He is best known for his viral videos on Twitter and TikTok. His work has been recognized by Vanity Fair, The Hollywood Reporter, Vulture, USA Today, and Just for Laughs.

Life and career 
Thomas was raised in Denver, Colorado, where he trained in improvisational comedy at the Bovine Metropolis Theater and Rise Comedy. He moved to Chicago in 2018 to pursue a comedy career. Thomas trained at The Second City and was a member of the house improv group Twisty.

After the onset of the pandemic in 2020, Thomas gained wider prominence for self-produced videos posted to Twitter and other social media sites. In particular, his video as an extraterrestrial member of the fictional Intergalactic Federation reviewing Earth's application for entry went viral. In other videos he has appeared as various creatures and exaggerated characters including a warthog, a fly, and a Southern attendee at the Kentucky Derby. His videos sometimes respond to current events such as one video where he posed as a female condor that reproduced asexually, based on an actual instance that was reported on in October 2021. In one parody video released in 2022, he posed as a Mars Inc. spokesperson announcing the changes to the green M&M's costume: "So you’re welcome, feminists, the green M&M is no longer a perfect 10." One video where he impersonates a pigeon at a Pride parade urging attendees to throw him bread was named to Vanity Fair's list of 2021 Best Performances. He was also recognized by The Hollywood Reporter as one of six notable social media comics.

Since 2021, he has regularly contributed guest writer for Wait, Wait...Don't Tell Me!.

Thomas will appear in his first television acting role as a recurring cast member on the upcoming Apple TV+ series Platonic starring Seth Rogen and Rose Byrne.

One of his Tweets was the solution to a New Yorker crossword puzzle question on July 12, 2022. Thomas was named to USA Today's 2022 list of 10 up-and-coming comedians you need to know and Vulture's list of Comedians You Should and Will Know in 2022.

Thomas was a performer in the 2023 CBS Showcase.

Accolades
 2021 New Faces, Just for Laughs
 Best Performances of 2021, Vanity Fair

References

External links 
 Official website
 

Living people
African-American comedians
Comedians from Colorado
Writers from Denver
African-American writers
1996 births